Pandit Raghunath Murmu Medical College (PRMMCH) is a full-fledged tertiary Government Medical College located in Rangamatia situated  from the district headquarter of Mayurbhanj District, Baripada, Odisha. It is one of the notable government medical college of Odisha, bagging the fourth position in the state, after SCB Medical College, MKCG Medical College and VIMSAR.

The college was inaugurated in 2017 by Odisha Chief Minister Naveen Patnaik. The college is administrated by the Government Of Odisha under the supervision of DMET comprises all the clinical and paraclinical departments of the undergraduate curriculum. This college is now working alongside the Pandit Raghunath Murmu Hospital which is located at the heart of the Baripada town. The hospital associated with the college is one of the largest in the Mayurbhanj district. The college is best known for its culture and campus situated in a peaceful area.

History
It was established in 2017 and is functioning as a full-fledged hospital from the date of establishment. This college is named after The Great Indian Writer and Linguist Pandit Raghunath Murmu who is well known for his invention of "Ol Chiki" script widely used in Santali Language. This college is consistently maintaining its fourth position in the state with its vast infrastructure and extraordinary academic results.

College and associated hospital
The college is associated with PRM Hospital which is located in the city 7 km away. The patient outflow is high in the main hospital. Now as per 2022, a new 600-bed hospital is under construction, near the college.

Extracurricular Activities and Cultural Programmes
Students have their own identity in the field of cultural events. They are continuously bagging prizes in the intermedics every year. And within the college also every occasion along with Annual Function, Fresher's event and Annual Sports etc are celebrated with full grandeur. The college also celebrates all the Indian festivals with full enthusiasm. The Students’ Union ensures the college functions smoothly with academic and cultural events. Various sports such as Cricket, Football, Volleyball, Tennis, Basketball etc are played on a daily basis. Various tournaments of different sports are also held. The college has a gym which encourages all the fitness enthusiasts for a healthy lifestyle. Different societies and clubs are also associated for dance, art, music, writing, films etc.

Courses offered and admission
The college imparts the degree Bachelor of Medicine and Bachelor of Surgery (MBBS) under the prestigious North Orissa University with an annual intake of 125. Till 2018 its annual intake was 100 students per year but with the increase in infrastructure its annual intake was increased to 125 from 2019 onwards. It is recognised by the Medical Council of India.

Selection to this college to the undergraduate (MBBS) course is done on the basis of merit through the single window national level exam National Eligibility and Entrance Test(NEET). 15% AIQ quota is there for All India students and 85% of the seats are there for state quota.

References

External links 
http://prmmchbaripada.in/

Medical colleges in Odisha
Universities and colleges in Odisha
Educational institutions established in 2017
2017 establishments in Odisha